Sinodraconarius is a genus of funnel weavers first described by Zhao & S. Q. Li in 2018.

Species
 it contains five species:
Sinodraconarius cawarongensis Zhao & S. Q. Li, 2018 — China
Sinodraconarius muruoensis Zhao & S. Q. Li, 2018 — China
Sinodraconarius patellabifidus (Wang, 2003) — China
Sinodraconarius sangjiuensis Zhao & S. Q. Li, 2018 — China
Sinodraconarius yui Zhao & S. Q. Li, 2018 — China

References

External links

Agelenidae
Araneomorphae genera